James Cameron (born 20 September 1979) is a former South African cricketer.  Cameron was a right-handed batsman who bowled right-arm fast-medium.  He was born in Johannesburg, Transvaal Province.

Cameron represented the Nottinghamshire Cricket Board in a single List A match against the Gloucestershire Cricket Board in the 1st round of the 2000 NatWest Trophy.  In his only List A match he scored 6 runs and bowled 4 wicket-less overs.

References

External links
 James Cameron at Cricinfo
 James Cameron at CricketArchive

1979 births
Living people
Cricketers from Johannesburg
South African cricketers
Nottinghamshire Cricket Board cricketers